The 2010 Pro Tour season was the fifteenth season of the Magic: The Gathering Pro Tour. It began on 13 February 2010 with Grand Prix Oakland, and ended on 12 December 2010 with the conclusion of the  2010 World Championship in Chiba, Japan. The season consisted of eighteen Grand Prixs, and four Pro Tours, located in San Diego, San Juan, Amsterdam, and Chiba. Gabriel Nassif, Brian Kibler, and Bram Snepvangers were inducted into the Hall of Fame at the World Championship in Chiba. Although the season formally ended with the conclusion of the World Championship, the final title of season was not awarded until three months later. Guillaume Matignon and Brad Nelson tied for Player of the Year. The title was decided by a single match between the two at the 2011 Pro Tour in Paris, which Nelson won by four games to two.

Mode 

Four Pro Tours and eighteen Grand Prixs were held in the 2010 season. Further Pro Points were awarded at national championships. These Pro Points were used mainly to determine the Pro Player club levels of players participating in these events, but also decide which player was awarded the Pro Player of the year title at the end of the season. Based on final standings Pro Points were awarded as follows:

Grand Prix – Oakland 

GP Oakland (13–14 February)
Format: Extended
Attendance: 770
 Matt Nass
 Adam Yurchick
 Conley Woods
 Travis Woo
 Pat Cox
 Joby Parish
 Petr Brozek
 Tomoharu Saitou

Pro Tour – San Diego (19–21 February 2010) 

Pro Tour San Diego was held at the San Diego Convention Center. The tournament began with five rounds of Standard, followed by three rounds of Zendikar-Worldwake Booster Draft on the first day. At the end of day one Gabriel Nassif and Luis Scott-Vargas were the only undefeated players left. The second day began with another Zendikar-Worldwake Booster Draft and was followed by five additional rounds of Standard. Luis Scott-Vargas was the story of the day, having won all his matches in day two as well, thus becoming only the second player to win each match in the Swiss portion of a Pro Tour, and the first to achieve this feat over sixteen rounds.

Of the final eight players only Scott-Vargas had ever reached the top eight before. He quickly defeated his Dutch opponent. In the remaining quarter-finals the other Americans, Craig Wescoe and Kyle Boggemes, won their matches as well. German Simon Görtzen won the fourth quarter, defeating the Belgian Niels Viaene. In the semi-final Görtzen ended Scott-Vargas's streak, thus making it to the final where he played Boggemes. Both players had chosen Jund (red-green-black) decks. Eventually the German prevailed in a close match over the full five games.

Tournament data 
Prize pool: $230,795
Players: 413
Format: Standard, Booster Draft (Zendikar-Worldwake)
Head Judge: Sheldon Menery

Top 8

Final standings

Pro Player of the year standings

Grand Prixs – Madrid, Kuala Lumpur, Yokohama, Brussels, Houston, Lyon, Washington D.C. 

GP Madrid (27–28 February)
Format: Legacy
Attendance: 2228
  Andreas Müller
  David Do Anh
  Richard Bland
  Tomoharu Saitou
  Rubén Gonzalez
  Lluis Restoy
  Alejandro Delgado
  Sven Dijt

GP Brussels (27–28 March)
Format: Standard
Attendance: 1667
  Emanuele Giusti
  Zoltan Szoke
  Tamas Nagy
  Steve Bernstein
  Nicolas Lambach
  Christophe Gregoir
  Francesco Cipolleschi
  Ludvig Londos

GP Washington, D.C. (22–23 May)
Format: Standard
Attendance: 1932
  Brad Nelson
  Owen Turtenwald
  Kyle Boggemes
  Joshua Wagener
  Brett Blackman
  Michael Stanfar
  Brad Carpenter
  Carlos Romão

GP Kuala Lumpur (13–14 March)
Format: Standard
Attendance: 518
  Ding Yuan Leong
  Xue Tong Du
  Jakguy Subcharoen
  Shingo Fukuta
  Shouta Yasooka
  Wei Han Chin
  Raffy Sarto
  Zhiyang Zhang

GP Houston (3–4 April)
Format: Extended
Attendance: 652
  Adam Yurchick
  Shaun Rodriquez
  Kenneth Ellis
  Todd Anderson
  Shuhei Nakamura
  Paulo Vitor Damo da Rosa
  Charles Lancaster
  Pete Picard

GP Yokohama (20–21 March)
Format: Extended
Attendance: 1122
  Katsuhiro Mori
  Masashiro Kuroda
  Min-su Kim
  Takashi Ishihara
  Kuo Tzu-Ching
  Yasunori Baba
  Atsuo Se
  Tomoyuki Honnami

GP Lyon (8–9 May)
Format: Limited
Attendance: 1425
  Florian Koch
  Tobias Gräfensteiner
  Peter Vieren
  Bram Snepvangers
  Joakim Almelund
  Lukas Blohon
  Vladimir Komanicky
  Marcello Calvetto

Pro Tour San Juan (28–30 May 2010) 

The second Pro Tour of the season was held in Puerto Rico Convention Center in San Juan, Puerto Rico. The formats were Zendikar Block Constructed and Rise of the Eldrazi Booster Draft with the Top 8 doing another Rise of the Eldrazi draft.

The following players made it to the final draft table (clockwise in order starting at seed one): Guillaume Matignon, Jeremy Neeman, Andrea Giarola, Paulo Vitor da Rosa, Brad Nelson, Noah Swartz, Koutarou Ootsuka, Josh Utter-Leyton. In his fifth individual Top 8 appearance Paulo Vitor da Rosa was finally able to win a quarterfinal match. Defeating Noah Swartz in the semifinals and Guillaume Matignon in the final, Paulo eventually claimed his first Pro Tour trophy.

 Tournament data 
Prize pool: $230,795
Players: 396
Format: Booster Draft (Rise of the Eldrazi), Zendikar'' Block Constructed
Head Judge: Sheldon Menery

Top 8

Final standings

Pro Player of the year standings

Grand Prixs – Sendai, Manila, Columbus, Gothenburg 

GP Sendai (5–6 June)
Format: Standard
Attendance: 907
  Brian Kibler
  Makihito Mihara
  Shouta Yasooka
  Motoaki Itou
  Takeshi Ozawa
  Yuuya Watanabe
  Hiroyuki Shimoya
  Ryou Tasaki

GP Gothenburg (28–29 August)
Format: Limited
Attendance: 1001
  Kenny Öberg
  Anton Jonsson
  Marijn Lybaert
  Allison Abe
  Nicolai Herzog
  Sami Häggkvist
  Samuel Black
  Markku Rikola

GP Manila (12–13 June)
Format: Standard
Attendance: 1071
  Naoki Nakada
  Taufik Indrakesuma
  Gerald Camangon
  Yuuya Watanabe
  Yuchen Liu
  Adrian Marasigan
  Yuuta Takahashi
  Bayani Manansala

GP Columbus (31 July–1 August)
Format: Legacy
Attendance: 1296
  Tomoharu Saitou
  Tom Martell
  Jason Ford
  Caleb Durward
  Bryant Cook
  Chris Gosselin
  Korey Age
  Brad Nelson

Pro Tour Amsterdam (3–5 September 2010) 

The third Pro Tour of the season was held in Amsterdam Convention Factory in Amsterdam, Netherlands. The formats were Extended and Booster Draft with the Top 8 playing Extended again.

Brad Nelson finished in first place after the Swiss rounds, thus continuing his string of Top 8 appearances that he had started at GP Washington in May. Despite losing in the final with his green-white-black Doran-deck, the additional Pro Points were sufficient to make him the leader in the Pro Player of the Year race. Kai Budde had his tenth showing in a Pro Tour Top 8 after six years of absence. He had piloted his Gabriel Nassif-designed White Weenie-deck to a 9–0–1 performance in the Swiss portion of the tournament before losing to Nelson. The eventual winner of the tournament was American Paul Rietzl, playing a White Weenie deck similar to Budde's.  Rietzl made a clean sweep of the Top 8 going 9-0, the first time this had ever been done at a Constructed Pro Tour.

Tournament data 

Prize pool: $230,795
Players: 457
Format: Extended, Booster Draft
Head Judge: Toby Elliott

Top 8

Final standings

Pro Player of the year standings

Grand Prixs – Portland, Sydney, Toronto, Bochum, Nashville, Florence 

GP Portland (11–12 September)
Format: Limited
Attendance: 1371
 Martin Juza
 Thomas Kiene
 Josh Layne
 Philip Bau
 Jonathan Louks
 Nicholas Lynn
 David Ochoa
 Paulo Vitor Damo da Rosa

GP Bochum (30–31 October)
Format: Limited
Attendance: 1814
 Martin Juza
 Yves Sele
 Julien Perez
 Geertjan Woltjes
 Manuel Mayer
 Jonas Köstler
 Sok-yong Lee
 Matthias Künzler

GP Sydney (9–10 October)
Format: Limited
Attendance: 434
 Jeremy Neeman
 Luis Scott-Vargas
 Jacky Zhang
 Isaac Egan
 Yuuya Watanabe
 Michael Dao
 Jarron Puszet
 Masayasu Tanahashi

GP Nashville (20–21 November)
Format: Limited
Attendance: 1481
 Gerry Thompson
 Ari Lax
 Gerard Fabiano
 John Kolos
 Josh Utter-Leyton
 Conley Woods
 Martin Juza
 Kyle Stoll

GP Toronto (23–24 October)
Format: Limited
Attendance: 1361
 Jonathan Smithers
 Brad Nelson
 Dustin Faeder
 Ben Stark
 Eric Froehlich
 David Howard
 Pat Cox
 Stephen Zhang

GP Florence (27–28 November)
Format: Limited
Attendance: 1291
 Pierluigi Aceto
 Nicola Landoni
 Shuhei Nakamura
 Citino Guido
 Mario Pascoli
 Tommi Lindgren
 Anders Melin
 Jörg Unfried

2010 World Championships – Chiba (9–12 December 2010) 

The 17th Magic World Championships was held in Makuhari Messe in Chiba, Japan. The tournament was won by Guillaume Matignon beating long-time friend and colleague Guillaume Wafo-Tapa in the final. In the team event, Slovakia defeated Australia in the finals.

Tournament data 

Prize pool: $245,245 (individual) + ? (teams)
Players: 352 (57 National Teams)
Formats: Standard, Booster Draft, Extended
Team Formats: Standard, Extended, Legacy
Head Judge: Riccardo Tessitori

Top 8

Final standings

Team Competition 
 Slovakia — Ivan Floch, Robert Jurkovic, Patrik Surab
 Australia — Adam Witton, Ian Wood, Jeremy Neeman

Pro Player of the Year final standings 
For the first time in Pro Tour history, there was a tie for Pro Player of the Year. The tie players, Brad Nelson and Guillaume Matignon, played a single match play-off at Pro Tour Paris 2011 to determine the winner of the 2010 Pro Player of the Year title.  Brad Nelson would win the match 4-2 to claim the 2010 Player of the Year title.

Performance by country 

The United States had the most Top 8 appearances at twelve, but they also had by far the most players playing in the Pro Tour. With 26 they also have the most Pro Club Level 4+ professional players. Compared to the previous season, the United States put 2 more players into Top 8s (+20%) and generated 9 additional "gravy trainers" (+53%). Japan's performance at the top fell sharply, putting 4 players less amongst the Top 8s (-67%) and also generating 8 level 4+ pros less than in the preceding season (-47%). Meanwhile, France had the second most Top 8 appearances at 4 after a single Top 8 in 2009.

T8 = Number of players from that country appearing in a Pro Tour Top 8; Q = Number of players from that country participating in Pro Tours; M = Median finish over all PTs; GT = Gravy Trainers (aka players with a Pro Players Club level of 4 or more) from that country created in the 2010 season; Best Player (PPts) = Player with the most Pro Points from that country, Pro Points of that player in brackets.

References 

Magic: The Gathering professional events